Eta Columbae is a solitary star near the southern boundary of the constellation Columba. It is visible to the naked eye, having an apparent visual magnitude of 3.96. Based upon an annual parallax shift of 6.91 mas, it lies at a distance of roughly 472 light years from the Sun.

This is an orange-hued K-type giant star with a stellar classification of K0 III, or possibly a bright giant with a crossover class of G8/K1 II. At the estimated distance of this star, this yields a physical size of about 38.6 times the radius of the Sun. It has an estimated 3.33 times the mass of the Sun and radiates 708 times the solar luminosity from its outer atmosphere at an effective temperature of 4,620 K.

References

K-type giants
Columba (constellation)
Columbae, Epsilon
Durchmusterung objects
040808
028328
02120